The Centre for Social Justice (CSJ) is an independent centre-right think tank based in the United Kingdom, co-founded in 2004 by Iain Duncan Smith, Tim Montgomerie, Mark Florman and Philippa Stroud.

Political positions

The organisation's stated aim is to "put social justice at the heart of British politics". While the think-tank states it is politically independent, it has been labelled one of the most influential on the British Conservative Party under the leadership of David Cameron.

Policy programmes and impact 
One of the CSJ's most notable reports was Breakthrough Britain. It has also produced well-publicised reports on gang culture, modern slavery, addiction, family breakdown, and educational failure. In 2012 the CSJ announced that it would carry out the study Breakthrough Britain II. The CSJ has also played important roles in the design and development of Universal Credit and in championing the introduction of the Modern Slavery Act 2015.

2019 
 A report called on the government to increase the state pension age to 75.

2018 

 A Woman-Centred Approach called on the government to scrap plans for up to five new women's prisons and to put funds towards community-based alternatives. The Ministry of Justice subsequently announced that plans for new women's prisons were being abandoned and set out proposals to pilot five residential centres for women in the community.

2017 

 Housing First recommended placing homeless people dealing with problems such as alcohol and drug abuse in permanent accommodation and giving them access to care and training. The approach, known as Housing First, had been tried out in the United States and adopted by Finland with positive results. Conservative Communities Secretary Sajid Javid had said that he was keen to examine the scheme. While the CSJ called for a nationwide roll-out of Housing First, the Government announced and allocated £28m funding for a number of Housing First pilot sites in the West Midlands, Liverpool and Manchester. 
 Growing the Local called on the government to give Police and Crime Commissioners additional flexibility to increase the police precept, a set of proposals subsequently adopted and providing additional resources for policing and crime. 
 Lowering the Stake on Fixed Odds Betting Terminals called on the government to reduce the stake from £100 to £2 for fixed odds betting terminals, which the government duly did in 2018.

Structure and operation 
Initially the CSJ's work was project-based with projects and staff members changing regularly. Recently, however, under Andy Cook, the latest Chief Executive, the CSJ has created a number of dedicated policy units with specific unit heads to lead on their designated area.

The CSJ also has an alliance of "front line poverty fighting charities" and runs an annual Centre for Social Justice Awards ceremony celebrating some of the best voluntary and non-profit organisations in the UK. In addition the CSJ regularly holds events at the major political party conferences.

Notable members
Past and present:
 Iain Duncan Smith
 Tim Montgomerie
 David Blunkett MP, Co-Chairman of the CSJ Advisory Council
 Johan Eliasch, Chairman and Chief Exec, Head N.V ; Chairman, Cool Earth; Prime Minister's Special representative on deforestation and clean energy
 Frank Field MP, Member of Parliament for Birkenhead (Independent)
 William Hague MP, former Foreign Secretary, former leader of the Conservative Party, former Member of Parliament for Richmond, Yorkshire (Conservative)
 Syed Kamall MEP, Co-founder of Global Business Research institute, MEP for London (Conservative)
 Paul Marshall, Chairman of Management Committee of Centre Forum; Adviser to Rt Hon Nick Clegg MP, Deputy Prime Minister and Leader of the Liberal Democrat Party
 Kevin Tebbit, Former Director of GCHQ and former Permanent Under Secretary of the Ministry of Defence
 Natalia Grosvenor, Duchess of Westminster

Funding 
In November 2022, the funding transparency website Who Funds You? gave the CSJ an E grade, the lowest transparency rating (rating goes from A to E).

See also 
 Housing First
 List of UK Thinktanks
 Modern Slavery Act 2015
 Universal Credit (welfare reform programme)

References

External links
Centre for Social Justice

Political and economic think tanks based in the United Kingdom
Social justice organizations
Think tanks based in the United Kingdom
2004 establishments in the United Kingdom
Think tanks established in 2004